Capilla de San Juan Bautista (English: The Chapel of Saint John the Baptist) is a historic church in La Garita, Colorado.

The structure was completed in 1923, and replaces an earlier church that was burned down. The church was added to the National Register in 1980.

References

Roman Catholic churches in Colorado
Churches on the National Register of Historic Places in Colorado
Churches completed in 1912
Buildings and structures in Saguache County, Colorado
1912 establishments in Colorado
National Register of Historic Places in Saguache County, Colorado
Roman Catholic chapels in the United States